The Serbian Left (abbr. СЛ, SL) is a political party in Serbia. It was established in January 2022, as a direct successor of the Communist Party.

Its leader is Radoslav Milojičić, former Democratic Party MP, while its honorary president is Joška Broz, former leader of the Communist Party. According to Milojičić, the party is in opposition to the Aleksandar Vučić government, although Broz still served in the Socialist Party of Serbia parliamentary group after SL was formed.

Electoral results

Parliamentary elections

References

Political parties in Serbia
Political parties established in 2022